is a Japanese gravure idol. She is from Kanagawa Pref. and interested in a takoyaki party and collecting pink items.

Profile
 Nickname:           Yoshizawa Gyu
 Profession:         'Gravure idol' (Japanese term: swimsuit/bikini model)
 Date of Birth:      25 June 1985
 Birthplace:         Kanagawa Pref., Japan
 Height:             154 cm (5 feet and 0.6 inches)
 Measurements:       B100 W60 H87 cm (B39.4 W23.6 H34.3 inches)
 Talent Agency:      Unknown

Filmography

Image DVDs 
 Boyon Boin (ボヨン・ボイン), Bunkasha 2005
 Super Boyon Boin (スーパーボヨンボイン), Bunkasha 2006
 Yureyure Tengoku (ユレユレ天国), Takeshobo 2006
 Koisuru Hamichichi (恋するハミチチ), Out Vision 2007
 Pai no Pai no Pai! (ぱいのPaiのパイ!), QH Eizo 2007
 Hamichichi Zenkai! (ハミチチ全開!), Out Vision 2008

External links 

 Sarii Yoshizawa: an Energy Saving Festival in Summer  - At "Scrambled Eggs on the Web", in June 2007
 DVD Release Event "Super Boyon Boin"  - At "Sofmap.com", in June 2006

1985 births
Living people
Models from Kanagawa Prefecture
Japanese gravure idols